Shinjuku held a mayoral election on November 12, 2006. Hiroko Nakayama, backed by the LDP and New Komeito Party was re-elected. Polling turnout was extremely low, only 26% but still about 1% more than last election.

Sources 
 Official results 
 ザ･選挙　-選挙情報-

Local elections in Japan
Shinjuku
2006 elections in Japan
Mayoral elections in Japan
November 2006 events in Japan
2006 in Tokyo